Varunapriya (pronounced ) is a rāgam in Carnatic music (musical scale of South Indian classical music). It is the 24th melakarta rāgam (parent scale) in the 72 melakarta rāgam system of Carnatic music. It is called Viravasantam; in Muthuswami Dikshitar school of Carnatic music.

Structure and Lakshana

It is the 6th rāgam in the 4th chakra Veda. The mnemonic name is Veda-Sha. The mnemonic phrase is sa ri gi ma pa dhu nu. Its  structure (ascending and descending scale) is as follows (see swaras in Carnatic music for details on below notation and terms):
: 
: 

The notes chathusruthi rishabham, sadharana gandharam, shuddha madhyamam, shatsruthi dhaivatham and kakali nishadham are used in this scale. As it is a melakarta, by definition it is a sampoorna rāgam (has all seven notes in ascending and descending scale). It is the shuddha madhyamam equivalent of Neetimati, which is the 60th melakarta scale.

Janya rāgams 
Varunapriya does not have janya rāgams (derived scales) associated with it. See List of janya rāgams for a full list of janya scales.

Compositions
A few compositions set to Varunapriya are:

Yemani pogadudu by Thyagaraja
Samashrayami Sada by Dr. M. Balamuralikrishna
Singara kumari by Koteeswara Iyer

Veeravasanta Thyagaraja by Muthuswami Dikshitar is set to Viravasantam.

Related rāgams
This section covers the theoretical and scientific aspect of this rāgam.

Varunapriya's notes when shifted using Graha bhedam, yields a minor melakarta rāgam, namely, Ragavardhini. Graha bhedam is the step taken in keeping the relative note frequencies same, while shifting the shadjam to the next note in the rāgam. For further details and an illustration refer Graha bhedam on Ragavardhini.

Notes

References

Melakarta ragas